The 16th AARP Movies for Grownups Awards, presented by AARP the Magazine, honored films released in 2016 and were announced on February 6, 2017. The awards recognized films created by and about people over the age of 50. The ceremony was hosted by actress Margo Martindale at the Beverly Wilshire Hotel. This was the last year that the awards were not broadcast on television. This was the final year an award was given for Best Comedy or for Best Movie for Grownups Who Refuse to Grow Up.

Awards

Winners and Nominees

Winners are listed first, highlighted in boldface, and indicated with a double dagger.

Career Achievement Award
 Morgan Freeman: "Whether he's portraying the president of the United States, a paternal prison inmate, or God himself, Freeman brings instinctive authority to every role thanks to his distinguished demeanor and rolling voice."

Films with multiple nominations and awards

References

AARP Movies for Grownups Awards
AARP
AARP